Nirmillem Nirmonem is a 2019 Indian Konkani-language romantic film directed by Melwin Elpel and produced by Henry D'Silva Suratkal. The film stars Prathap Menezes, Hera Pinto and Seema Buthello in the lead roles. The film's background score is composed by Nandhu J Jabez, music by Pappan Joswin with cinematography handled by Manjunath Hegde and editing done by Chandu Vuppalapati.

After the success of Nashibaso Khel(2016) film this is the second film produced by Henry D'silva under the banner of Preston Enterprises. Nirmillem Nirmonem was released theatrically on 23 Aug 2019, and generally received positive reviews from critics, praising the cast performances (particularly Hera Pinto, Prathap Menezes ,Meenakshi Martins and Seema Buthello).

Plot 
The film revolves around the lives of Linora, a rich kid and Sunny, a foster kid of a priest who grew up in a quiet village of Mangalore. They have a excellent childhood and grow up together.

All is well when suddenly life takes a turn and they are separated. Linora gets married to NRI Businessman Godwin and flew to Dubai, Realising this depressed Sunny gets into a car accident in the middle of the night driven by Dr. Hera. She takes care of him until he recalls his past. Hera develops a bond with sunny but he refuses her proposal as he only loved Linora and comes back to the priest in the foster house.

At the end when Linora realises her betrayal towards sunny comes back to the homeland but it was too late as he had already moved on and found his life's true purpose.

Cast 

 Prathap Menezes as Sunny
 Seema Buthello as Linora
 Hera Pinto as Hera
 Meenakshi Martins as Nora
 Norbert John D'Souza as Joy
 Humbert Fernandes as Butler
 Arun Nazareth as Butler
 Reshma Sawant as housekeeper, Sunny's mother
 Noyal D'Souza as bad guy
 Ronnie Fernandes as Priest
Other Casts include Charles Gomes, Godwin Sparkle, MC Preetham, Jhon, Kavitha Miyar, Social Pinto.

Actress Vinny Fernandes(63) one of the cast member of the film died due to cardiac arrest on Thursday 29 July 2021.

Direction Department 
Melwin Elpel after Hutthadha Suttha (2018) Kannada-language suspense-thriller film makes a konkani debut with Nirmillem Nirmonem.

Norbert John D'Souza who also worked on Hutthadha Suttha as co-director joins Nirmillem Nirmonem as an actor in a negative role along with co-directing it with Melwin.He also serves as a screenwriter for the movie.

Santhosh Rai Mulleria roped in as an associate director.

Rayan Magneto YouTube content creator joined as a first assistant director followed by Milan Markanja and Jerald Percy from the second schedule on wards.

Production 

The Muhurat of the film was held on 12 August 2018 at Suratkal Sacred Heart Church, Fr.Paul Pinto and Fr. Andrew claps the Muhurat Shot. Under this schedule interval and hospital scenes were shot. The schedule wrapped up after 6 days of shoot.

The Second scheduled of the film commenced from November, 2018 where the film shot for about 3 weeks and completed most of the talky portions.

The third and final schedule of the film along with song shoot took place in January 2019 and After 45 days of filming, the makers wrapped up the shoot.

Music 

The film's background score is composed by KGF fame Nandhu J Jabez. The music is given by Pappan Joswin.

Tune and lyrics were provided by the late Wilfy Rebimbus.

Wilson Kateel has also penned additional lyrics for the movie.

Film's audio and trailer launch was held at St Sebastian Church Mini Auditorium, Bendur on  14 July 2022.

Release 
 The film released on 23 August 2019 across coastal Karnataka Theatres including Multiplexes like PVR, Big Cinemas and Single screens including Amarashree Talkies and Planet Cinema
 The Malayalam Dubbed version was released on 27 September 2019 at Mehboob Theatre Kasaragod
 In Israel on 11 Oct 2019 at Cinema Theque, Tel Aviv, Israel
 It got released in Kuwait at the American International School Auditorium – Maidan Hawally on 15 November 2019, under the banner of "Abbasiya Konkani Families Kuwait (A.K.F.K)
 In Doha Qatar at the Asian Town Cinema Hall#4 on 29 November 2019
 In Dubai on Valentines Day 14 February 2020 at Novo Cinemas, Ibn Batuta Mall followed by Sharjah show is being scheduled for Friday 21 February 2020 in Novo Cinemas, Mega Mall, Sharjah

Distribution 
Nirmillem Nirmonem become the first konkani film to get Dubbed into Malayalam, sold rights to Kerala based M Cinemas.

References 

2010s Konkani-language films